Serge Yves Roland Ayeli (born 23 August 1981) is a retired  Ivorian footballer, who played as a striker.

References

1981 births
Living people
Ivorian footballers
Ivory Coast international footballers
Association football forwards
OGC Nice players
FC Lorient players
LB Châteauroux players
Hapoel Ironi Kiryat Shmona F.C. players
Hapoel Haifa F.C. players
Hapoel Ra'anana A.F.C. players
Maccabi Ahi Nazareth F.C. players
Hapoel Ramat Gan F.C. players
Beitar Jerusalem F.C. players
Hapoel Ashkelon F.C. players
Hapoel Bnei Lod F.C. players
Maccabi Yavne F.C. players
Hapoel Jerusalem F.C. players
Expatriate footballers in Israel
Liga Leumit players
Israeli Premier League players